"Always Forever" is a song by American singer Bryson Tiller, released on September 
21, 2020, as the second single from his third studio album, Anniversary. The song sees Tiller lamenting about a lost love whose feelings are not reciprocated.

Composition and lyrics
Over "smoothed-out" production and his signature trap-infused drums, Tiller details a one-sided love, coming to terms with "forever" not being for always, because he and his lovers' emotions are worlds apart, due to trust issues and dishonesty. Although he seems ready to move on, he finds it difficult to do so as easily as his partner did.

Critical reception
Aaron Williams of Uproxx said the slow song allows Tiller to show off his vocals more than his bars. Ayana Rashed of Respect said Tiller's "mesmerizing vocals" are on full display, "reminding fans of his signature style that they've come to know and love".

Cover artwork
The song's cover art is a vintage-type photo of Tiller in all-white. HotNewHipHops Alex Zidel noted the cover is "fairly simple, embracing the modesty of his music and sound".

Charts

References

2020 singles
2020 songs
Bryson Tiller songs
Songs written by Bryson Tiller
Songs written by Teddy Walton
RCA Records singles
Trap music songs